Levi Fontaine (born November 1, 1948) is a retired professional basketball shooting guard who played one season in the National Basketball Association (NBA) as a member of the San Francisco Warriors (1970–71). He attended the University of Maryland Eastern Shore where he was drafted by the Warriors during the fifth round of the 1970 NBA draft. Maryland averaged 102.8 points per game during Levi's senior year as it chalked up a 27–2 record, including a 23-game winning streak, and won the championship of the Central Intercollegiate Athletic Association.  Levi's best single game scoring production was 39 points, and he did it four times.

External links
 

1948 births
Living people
American men's basketball players
Basketball players from Maryland
Maryland Eastern Shore Hawks men's basketball players
People from Princess Anne, Maryland
San Francisco Warriors draft picks
San Francisco Warriors players
Shooting guards